Dasht is a village in Miyan Khaf Rural District, in the Central District of Khaf County, Razavi Khorasan Province, Iran. At the 2006 census, its population was 125, in 28 families.

References 

Populated places in Khaf County